Hungerford's crawling water beetle (Brychius hungerfordi) is a critically endangered member of the family Haliplidae of water beetles.  The US Fish and Wildlife Service Draft Recovery Plan for the species published in August 2004 estimates roughly 1000 individuals are present in the wild. In 2010, a five-year summary report by the United States Fish and Wildlife Service found the population to be essentially unchanged.

The species was first discovered by entomologist Paul J. Spangler in 1954.

Endangered status
Hungerford's crawling water beetle was categorized as endangered on March 7, 1994, under the provisions of the U.S. Endangered Species Act. The Hungerford's crawling water beetle is currently not protected in Canada. At the time that the species was listed on the endangered species list, it was found only in three U.S. sites, all in Michigan. It is the most endangered species in Michigan and at the time of its listing, the only one limited exclusively to Michigan.

Known populations
Known populations of Hungerford's crawling water beetles are limited to cold-water streams in only five locations. Four of these are in Michigan and one is in Ontario.

Michigan locations
Almost all known Hungerford's crawling water beetles live in a single location: the East Branch of the Maple River in Emmet County, Michigan. This location consists of a two and a half mile stretch of the river downstream from the Douglas Road crossing. This area supports the only stable population of the Hungerford's crawling water beetle, recording nearly 1052 beetles when last counted in 2002. This area is largely within and along the boundary of the University of Michigan Biological Station.

Of the remaining sites, a second is also in Emmet County. This is near the Oliver Road crossing of the Carp Lake River, where 4 adult specimens were recorded in 1997, but erosion at the road seems to have harmed the habitat and no specimens were found in the last survey conducted in 
2003.

In Montmorency County, Michigan two more sites have yielded official records of Hungerford's crawling water beetles. Along the East Branch of the Black River inside the Mackinaw State Forest, two adult beetles were found in surveys in 1989 and again in 1996 two more adults were found. Still, the status of the population there remains uncertain. In July 1999, six additional adult beetles were identified elsewhere in the Mackinaw State Forest in Van Hetton Creek.

The Carp Lake River and Van Hetton Creek identifications were significant as they represented a new location beyond those originally identified when the Hungerford's crawling water beetle was categorized as endangered in 1994. This suggests that the rare beetle may occur in other sites as yet undiscovered.

Ontario location
The only known population of Hungerford's crawling water beetles outside of the United States inhabit the North Saugeen River near Scone in Bruce County, Ontario. In 1986, 42 beetles were identified at a site downstream from a dam there. An unspecified number of beetles were last recorded in 2001, but surveys in 2002 uncovered no specimens. As a result, the status of this population of Hungerford's crawling water beetles is uncertain at present.

Habitat
It is believed that the Hungerford's crawling water beetle requires cool, swift flowing alkaline streams with sand and gravel bottoms. While in their larval stage, the beetles gather in concentrations of microalgae and in slower moving waters. The beetles are thought to have historically favored beaver dams.

Description
Like all Haliplidae the adult form of the Hungerford crawling water beetle is more or less ovoid, with a markedly convex upperside.  They have a yellowish-brown color with irregular dark markings. They are extremely small ( long) which may contribute to the difficulty in locating them. Their wing covers are characterized by perforated stripes. The sides of their dorsal plate behind the head are nearly parallel for the basal two-thirds before widening at the sides.

As characteristic of all Haliplidae, the hindlegs of Hungerford crawling water beetles have very distinctive and comparatively large coxal plates that cover most of the beetle's abdominal underside as well as parts of its hindlegs. These hindleg plates do not move although they are not fused to the beetle's centerline. As with all Haliplidae, these specialized hindleg plates function as air storage devices supplementing the air carried under the wing covers.

Although most other Haliplidae are capable of flight, no observation has ever been recorded of a Hungerford's crawling water beetle flying. The absence of flight may contribute to the extreme limitation of its habitat, as flight might have helped it to spread over a larger area.

References

Haliplidae
Beetles of North America
Endangered fauna of the United States
Beetles described in 1954
ESA endangered species